Salvatore Petruolo (January 4, 1857 in Catanzaro, Kingdom of the Two Sicilies – 1946 in Naples, Italy), was an Italian painter.

Petruolo was a pupil of Gabriele Smargiassi at the Institute of Fine Arts in Naples. He is famous for his coastal landscapes, near Naples and very rare landscapes of Calabria. His landscapes from 1875 to 1898 show the style of the School of Posillipo with influences of Edoardo Dalbono. After 1898 his painting style became more personal and distinctive, with a symbolist influence.

He was popular with English and American visitors to Naples. His studio was visited by people including Empress Frederick, the Duke and Duchess of Edinburgh, the Prince of Battenberg, Princess Louise, sister of King Edward of England. In 1889 he stayed with Duke and Duchess of Edinburgh at Malta for three months. He went on a painting trip to Spain visiting Granada, Seville, Cordoba and Zaragoza. He showed the works from this trip in an exhibition at Clarence House in London.

Works in museums 
 Museo d'arte of Avellino (Italy) with Paesaggio innevato (1874)
 Museo Nazionale di Capodimonte of Napoli (Italy) with Marina di Sorrento (1884).
 Pinacoteca "Enrico Giannelli" of Parabita  (LE) (Italy).
 Pinacoteca Civica "Giuseppe De Nittis" of Barletta (Italy)with Pini (1908).

References

Bibliography 
 (IT) MARINI Giuseppe Luigi (1994), “Salvatore Petruolo”, in IDEM Il valore dei dipinti italiani dell'Ottocento e del primo novecento, edizione XI (1993/1994), Umberto Allemandi & C., Torino 1994, pp. 362–363. 
 (IT) MARINI Giuseppe Luigi (2002), “Salvatore Petruolo”, in IDEM Il valore dei dipinti italiani dell'Ottocento e del primo novecento, edizione XIX (2001/2002), Umberto Allemandi & C., Torino 2002, pp. 234–235.
 (IT) RICCI Paolo (1981), “Salvatore Petruolo”, in IDEM Arte ed artisti a Napoli, 1800-1943, Edizioni Banco di Napoli, Napoli 1981, pag. 109.
 (IT)  SCIOLI Tonino - VALENTE Isabella (1997), “Salvatore Petruolo”, in IDEM L'animo e lo sguardo. Pittori calabresi dell'Ottocento di scuola napoletana, Editoriale progetto 2000, Cosenza 1997, pag. 113.

Other websites 
  Information in Italian

1857 births
1942 deaths
People from Catanzaro
Kingdom of the Two Sicilies people
19th-century Italian painters
Italian male painters
20th-century Italian painters
Painters from Naples
Italian landscape painters
19th-century Italian male artists
20th-century Italian male artists